Reentry can have several meanings:

Criminal legal system
 Prisoner reentry, also referred to simply as "reentry", the process by which prisoners who have been released return to the community

Music
 Re-Entry (Big Brovaz album)
 Re-Entry (Marley Marl album)
 Re-Entry (Techno Animal album)
 Re-Entry by The Phenomenauts
  Re-entry, or reentrant tuning, an effect that occurs with a break in the sequence of pitches to which the strings of a stringed instrument are tuned

Science and healthcare
 Reentry (neural circuitry) in neuroscience
 Re-entry, or reentrant dysrhythmia, a type of cardiac arrhythmia
 Atmospheric entry, the movement of human-made or natural objects as they enter the atmosphere of a planet from outer space
 Skip reentry

See also
 Reentrant (disambiguation)